The Palos Verdes Hills are a low mountain range on the southwestern coast of Los Angeles County, California. They sit atop the Palos Verdes Peninsula, a sub-region of the Los Angeles metropolitan area.

The Palos Verdes Hills are the landed end of the Channel Islands of California, a mountains formation in the Transverse Ranges System.

Portuguese Bend
The Portuguese Bend Landslide area of the Palos Verdes Hills is geologically unstable and is unsuitable for building. However it is a natural research laboratory for the study of island biogeography and evolutionary ecology. The geographical location and geological history of the hills make the remaining coastal sage scrub habitat at Portuguese Bend extremely valuable for ecological and other scientific reasons. The Palos Verdes Peninsula, which was an island with the Palos Verdes Hills in recent geological time, has close floral and faunal similarities to the Channel Islands.

A species of the succulent live-forever, Bright green dudleya or Dudleya virens, is endemic to the Channel Islands and the Palos Verdes Peninsula.

Features
The hills are the location of affluent suburban communities and cities together known as Palos Verdes, and include Palos Verdes Estates,  Rancho Palos Verdes, San Pedro, gated Rolling Hills, and Rolling Hills Estates.

The Wayfarers Chapel is on the south face of the hills, overlooking the Pacific at the western entrance of Portuguese Bend. It is a transparent glass chapel within a planted Coast redwood forest, designed in 1951 by the renowned architect and landscape architect Lloyd Wright. It is under the stewardship of the Swedenborgian Church, and is a well-known local landmark on the National Register of Historic Places in Los Angeles County.

The large and diverse Los Angeles County South Coast Botanic Garden is located in the central Palos Verdes Hills. It is an  landscaped botanical garden, event venue, and arboretum with over 150,000 landscape plants and trees from California and around the world.

See also
Transverse Ranges

References

External links

 Mindat.org: Palos Verdes Hills minerals – Palos Verdes Peninsula.
 Mindat.org: Detailed report of the minerals of the Palos Verdes Hills
 

 01
Hills of California
Mountain ranges of Los Angeles County, California
Transverse Ranges
South Bay, Los Angeles